AN/PRC 113 Radio Set is a manpack, portable VHF and UHF AM combat radio transceiver manufactured by Magnavox America. In the Joint Electronics Type Designation System (JETDS), AN/PRC translates to "Army/Navy, Portable, Radio, Communication.

History 
The AN/PRC-113 is a tactical, short range, manpack, ground to air / air to ground / ground to ground radio used primarily by Forward Air Controller (FAC) teams, Forward Observers (FO) and Marine Air Command and Control agencies. It was also used by some units in the active army, national guard and reserves, but mostly by support elements. It was first introduced by the Magnavox Corporation in 1986 and was quickly well liked by ground troops because of its simplicity and ease of use.

Technical characteristics 
The AN/PRC 113 consists of the RT-1319 transceiver and minor components. It can provide secure voice communications with the external TSEC/KY-57 device and is compatible with the HAVEQUICK II frequency hopping mode. It is a radio designed to allow ground forces to communicate with aircraft on either the VHF AM aircraft band (116.000 to 149.975 MHz) or the UHF AM aircraft band (225.000 to 399.975 MHz) in 25 kHz steps. Some versions also have FM capabilities that allows communications on the same frequency range in FM mode. Its first use was for the GRC-206 Program Pacer Speak used by Forward Air Controllers (FAC).

All AN/PRC-113s contain a "Guard Receiver" tuned to the military rescue/survival frequency of 243 MHz but not to the civilian counterpart frequency of 121.5 MHz. These radios have been phased out and replaced by the newer manpack ASIP and AN/PRC-148 MBITR radios that cover everything between 2 and 512 MHz.

Users 
Royal Air Force, Royal Australian Air Force, US Military, US Army Green Berets, US Army Rangers, US Army Night Stalkers, USMC MAGTF, US Navy/USMC VBSS teams, US Navy Seal teams, US Navy/Army/Air Force EOD units, US Air Force TACP and JTAC.

See also
 List of military electronics of the United States

References

Military radio systems of the United States
Military electronics of the United States
Military equipment introduced in the 1980s